Tylomelania baskasti is a species of freshwater snail with an operculum, an aquatic gastropod mollusk in the family Pachychilidae.

The specific name baskasti is in honor of the German author and journalist Bas Kast, who supported the malacological research.

Distribution 
This species occurs in the Malili lake system, in Sulawesi, Indonesia. Its type locality is Larona River.

Ecology 
Newly hatched snails of Tylomelania baskasti have a shell height of 5.7-8.4 mm.

References

External links 
 

baskasti
Gastropods described in 2008